The LVIII Edition of the Viña del Mar International Song Festival (Spanish: LVIII Festival Internacional de la Canción de Viña del Mar 2017), also known as Viña 2017, took place from February 20 to 25, 2017 at Quinta Vergara Amphitheater, in the Chilean city of Viña del Mar.


Development

Day 1 - Monday 20

Day 2 - Tuesday 21
  Camila
  Sin Bandera
  Daniela "Chiqui" Aguayo

Day 3 - Wednesday 22
  Isabel Pantoja
  Río Roma
  Carlos "El Mono" Sánchez

Day 4 - Thursday 23
  Olivia Newton-John
  Juan Luis "Jaja" Calderón
  Peter Cetera

Day 5 - Friday 24
  Maluma
  Américo
  Rodrigo Villegas

Day 6 - Saturday 25
  J Balvin
  Lali Espósito
  Mon Laferte
  Fabrizio Copano
  Márama
  Rombai

Jury
  Maluma
  Lali Espósito
  Mon Laferte
  Power Peralta
  Mario Domm, from Camila
  Río Roma
  Gastón Bernardou, from Los Auténticos Decadentes
  Mariela Encarnación
  Marcela Pino (Jury of the people)
  Carolina Varleta

Queen of the Festival 
The Chilean model and panelist of the morning programme of Canal 13 "Bienvenidos" Kika Silva was elected Queen of the Festival of Viña del Mar with 143 votes of the journalists.

References

Viña del Mar International Song Festival by year
Vina Del Mar International Song Festival, 2016
2017 in music
2017 festivals in Chile
2017 music festivals
February 2017 events in South America